Kamal Habibollahi (1930 – 2016) was the last Commander of the Imperial Iranian Navy until the Islamic Revolution and was the last  under Pahlavi dynasty. He also several held minister positions in the Military government of Gholam Reza Azhari in 1978.

Early life 
Kamal was born in 1930 in Astara. His father was Mir-Ketab-Allah, who was dedicated land to build the Mosque of Gharib al-Ghuraba in Astara in 1910. He was buried in that mosque's yard. After his father died, he spent most of his time being raised in various cities until High School, when he finally moved to Tehran, Pahlavi Iran and graduated from Dar ul-Funun. Although he was accepted to University, Habibollahi saw a poster announcing that the Imperial Iranian Navy was recruiting college students to become officers. He had always had a lifelong interest in history and a respect for the navy for trying to fight the Anglo-Soviet invasion of Iran, Habibollahi registered and after taking the Naval Entry exam, was accepted to become a Naval Officer with the Imperial Iranian Navy

Career
Habibollahi graduated from the Royal Navy Officer Program, U.S. Naval Post Graduate School, and U.S. Naval War College. He rose through the ranks of the Navy and ultimately served as the Commander of the Imperial Iranian Navy. He played a leading role in developing the Chahbahar naval port.

Habibollahi resigned from this role upon the collapse of the Bakhtiar government. An outspoken critic of the incoming Khomeini regime and radical Islam, following the 1979 Iranian Revolution, He went into hiding after the revolution since many major government members were being executed, and then eventually managed to go to Turkey Next he settled in the United States, where he resided in the Washington D.C. area. He continued to promote attention to free Iran causes as well as warn against the dangers of global Islamic extremism and terrorism through speeches at universities, military academies, panels, and both US and Iranian media outlets.

Tabarzin attack
The ship which was now completed, was to be delivered to Iran via the south of France and the Captain of the ship secretly agreed to allow them to take over the ship. His group, Azadegan Organization, consisted of several young Iranians. Habibollahi managed to take the team to Cádiz, Spain. After spending several days blending in, they hired a fishing boat named the Salazon to take them out under the cover of Oceanography. By that time, they disguised themselves as Civil Guard (Spain) officers, and once onboard, they took out fake weapons and forced the crew to get down. Once they succeeded, they asked for the keys to the ammunition room, and armed with real weapons, they seized the remaining crew and ordered them to be locked up in their cabins. They were intercepted by Civil Guard (Spain) helicopters, whom Habibollahi got rid of by entering international waters. In a symbolic act, they ripped down the Iran flag and replaced it with the Pahlavi Iran flag. With all the press on him, Habibollahi decided to dock in Morocco to pick up Reza Pahlavi. However, Habibollahi instead found himself under arrest, and in an attempt to free the ship, Reza Pahlavi made a deal to dissociate himself from them, in return to let Habibollahi and the Azadegan Organization go back to France and turn themselves in. Habibollahi agreed and before departing the Tabarzin for the last time, a brief ceremony was held where the Imperial Iran flag was lowered to the Imperial Anthem for the last time with many salutes from French Marines, ending 2500 years of Persian naval tradition that began under Artemisia I of Caria under Xerxes I but now ended with the man standing before them, Kamal Habibollahi.

References

External links 
 

20th-century Iranian politicians
1930 births
2016 deaths
American people of Iranian descent
Commanders of Imperial Iranian Navy
Exiles of the Iranian Revolution in the United States
Government ministers of Iran
Imperial Iranian Navy vice admirals
Naval Postgraduate School alumni
Naval War College alumni
People from Astara, Iran
Education ministers of Iran